Ballarat and Queen's Anglican Grammar School is an independent, co-educational, Anglican, day and boarding school located in Wendouree (Ballarat), Victoria, Australia.

History
Ballarat Church of England Grammar School for Boys was opened by Bishop Browne on the current Forest Street site in 1911.  The Church of England Girls’ Grammar School was acquired by the Anglican Diocese in 1918 having formerly been Queen’s College which was established 1877, and later having “Queen’s” once again included in the name.

The two schools amalgamated in 1973, and became Ballarat and Queen’s Anglican Grammar School on the Forest Street site.

For the 2011 Century Year Celebrations, a book 'Met by Wendouree' captures much of the history of the schools.  Although both were originally small schools, many alumni have made significant contributions to the nation in politics, in academia, education and health services and business, and as musicians and artists.  Many are mentioned in the book.

Headmasters
The first headmaster of Ballarat Grammar was Percy Ansell Robin. Other notable headmasters include G. F. J. Dart.

Adam Heath has been the Headmaster since 2016. Previous to this he was the Middle School Principal at Kristin School in Auckland, New Zealand. Heath originally studied Outdoor Education at La Trobe University and more recently he has completed a master's degree in School Leadership with First Class Honours at The University of Melbourne. After his early teaching in Mallacoota and the UK, Heath moved to join Caulfield Grammar as Head of their Yarra Junction Campus. In 2005, he was appointed as the founding Head of Middle School at Scotch Oakburn College in Launceston.

Previous to Adam Heath, Stephen Higgs was the Headmaster of Ballarat Grammar for 21 years.

Campus
Ballarat and Queen's Anglican Grammar School's main campus is located in Ballarat, on the corner of Howitt and Forest streets, Wendouree.  The expansive campus stretches as far north as Norman Street, and west towards Dare Street. Both the Senior School and Junior School are situated on the same campus, sharing many facilities and resources. The Wendouree Centre for Performing Arts is accessed by students via the southern part of the campus, and by the general public via Howitt St.

The Wendouree Centre for Performing Arts (WCPA) was opened in 2006 through a partnership between the school and the wider Ballarat community. It is used by the school and also hosts community events and performances. Ballarat Grammar's Music School is located within the WCPA, featuring tutorial and rehearsal rooms and a professional recording suite. 

The Heinz Centre is a Year 9 Environmental Centre, opened in 2001. The centre was the venue for the Sustainable Building Expo held in 2002 as part of World Environment Week. It won the 2002 BEN Environment Award.

The school also has a farming campus at Mount Rowan. This campus is used by grade 4 students and VCE Agriculture-Horticulture students.

The schools City Cite is their campus in the Melbourne CBD and students in year 9 will attend this campus for three weeks in term 4. 
 
Ballarat and Queens Anglican Grammar School is a sister school to St Augustine's High School, an Anglican Mission boarding school in Punjabi, Zimbabwe.

Academic standing

Sport
Rowing is considered by many to be the school's most celebrated sport. The Ballarat Associated Schools (BAS) crews compete in the annual "Head of the Lake", which is held at Lake Wendouree.

The Ballarat Grammar Senior Girls Australian Rules Football team has had great success in recent years, winning the Ballarat Associated Schools (BAS) Premiership every year since 2013. Coached by teacher Matt Hanlon, the team was first successful in the AFL Victoria Herald Sun Shield (HSS) Championship in 2014, where they claimed the School Girls Division 1 title. The best on ground for the 2015 game was Rene Caris who was drafted to the Geelong Football Club in the 2018 AFL Women's draft. In 2016 and 2017, the Ballarat Grammar Senior Girls Football team triumphed in the Herald Sun Shield claiming Division 1 titles in successive years at RAMS Arena and the MCG respectfully. In 2017, Lauren Butler, who was drafted to the Collingwood Football Club in the 2018 AFL Women's draft, was named best on ground in the Herald Sun Shield Grand Final.

Renee Saulitis is the one of the most recent draftees to the AFLW competition from the Ballarat Grammar Australian Rules Football program, having been drafted to the St Kilda Football Club with pick 34 in the 2020 AFL Women's draft. Maggie Caris, younger sister of Rene Caris of the Geelong Football Club, was also drafted in the 2020 AFL Women's draft to the Melbourne Football Club at pick 17. Nominees for the 2021 AFL Women's draft include Ballarat Grammar students Ella Friend and Nyakoat Dojiok which will take place later in the year.

BAS premierships 
Ballarat Grammar has won the following BAS premierships. Premierships won prior to 1973 were done so by the pre-amalgamation schools.

Combined:

 Athletics (18) - 1986, 1987, 1999, 2000, 2001, 2004, 2005, 2006, 2007, 2008, 2012, 2013, 2014, 2015, 2016, 2017, 2018, 2019
 Badminton (8) - 1989, 1995, 1996, 1997, 2004, 2012, 2014, 2018
 Cross Country (19) - 2000, 2001, 2002, 2003, 2004, 2005, 2006, 2007, 2008, 2009, 2010, 2012, 2013, 2014, 2015, 2016, 2017, 2018, 2019
 Lap of the Lake (19) - 2001, 2002, 2003, 2004, 2005, 2006, 2007, 2008, 2009, 2010, 2011, 2012, 2013, 2014, 2015, 2016, 2017, 2018, 2019
 Road Relay (20) - 2000, 2001, 2002, 2003, 2004, 2005, 2006, 2007, 2008, 2009, 2010, 2011, 2012, 2013, 2014, 2015, 2016, 2017, 2018, 2019

Boys:

 Athletics (16) - 1925, 1926, 1931, 1934, 1947, 1972, 1973, 1974, 2000, 2004, 2005, 2014, 2015, 2016, 2017, 2018
 Badminton (5) - 2004, 2005, 2012, 2013, 2015
 Basketball (6) - 1983, 1987, 1988, 1990, 1991, 2019
 Cricket (22) - 1912, 1913, 1916, 1931, 1933, 1942, 1969, 1970, 1971, 1972, 1974, 1979, 1981, 1983, 1984, 1985, 1986, 1991, 2002, 2003, 2006, 2020
 Cricket T20 (3) - 2016, 2017, 2018
 Cross Country (7) - 2005, 2007, 2008, 2010, 2011, 2014, 2015
 Football (2) - 1962, 1969
 Hockey (19) - 1983, 1988, 1989, 1991, 1999, 2000, 2001, 2002, 2003, 2004, 2005, 2007, 2008, 2011, 2012, 2013, 2014, 2015, 2019
 Lap of the Lake (7) - 1974, 2002, 2003, 2004, 2005, 2006, 2007
 Road Relay (15) - 2001, 2002, 2004, 2005, 2006, 2007, 2008, 2011, 2012, 2013, 2014, 2015, 2016, 2017, 2018
 Soccer (8) - 1983, 1985, 1986, 1991, 1992, 1998, 2004, 2005
 Tennis (17) - 1922, 1923, 1924, 1937, 1940, 1947, 1950, 1981, 1988, 1989, 2001, 2002, 2004, 2012, 2018, 2019, 2020
 Volleyball (10) - 2002, 2004, 2005, 2014, 2015, 2016, 2017, 2018, 2019, 2020

Girls:

 Athletics (10) - 1961, 1984, 1987, 2003, 2004, 2005, 2007, 2015, 2017, 2019
 Badminton (2) - 2006, 2014
 Basketball (4) - 1976, 2015, 2018, 2019
 Cricket (12) - 1983, 1984, 1986, 1987, 1988, 1989, 2000, 2015, 2016, 2017, 2018, 2019
 Cross Country (13) - 2001, 2002, 2003, 2006, 2007, 2008, 2010, 2013, 2014, 2015, 2016, 2017, 2019
 Football (6) - 2014, 2015, 2016, 2017, 2018, 2019
 Hockey (23) - 1973, 1974, 1977, 1978, 1979, 1981, 1988, 1990, 1992, 1993, 1994, 1995, 1997, 1999, 2002, 2003, 2004, 2005, 2006, 2007, 2008, 2009, 2017
 Lap of the Lake (9) - 2002, 2003, 2004, 2010, 2013, 2014, 2015, 2016, 2017
 Netball (11) - 1975, 1976, 1979, 1980, 1981, 1982, 1983, 2002, 2014, 2015, 2016
 Road Relay (14) - 2001, 2002, 2003, 2004, 2006, 2007, 2011, 2013, 2014, 2015, 2016, 2017, 2018, 2019
 Soccer (5) - 2005, 2007, 2009, 2015, 2016
 Softball (9) - 1962, 1972, 1983, 1984, 1989, 2001, 2005, 2006, 2012
 Volleyball (26) - 1986, 1988, 1990, 1991, 1993, 1994, 1996, 1997, 1998, 1999, 2000, 2002, 2003, 2004, 2005, 2006, 2007, 2008, 2009, 2010, 2014, 2015, 2016, 2017, 2018, 2019

House system

The house system is very important to the structure of the school, and there is substantial rivalry between houses in swimming, athletics, choral competitions, and more. The house system also provides pastoral care and a degree of mentoring to students.  The rivalry is particularly seen between the two boys' boarding houses, Dart and Wigan, which often used to engage in pranks against each other. This practice was abandoned in 2007 after new administration deemed the activities of the boarding houses to be inappropriate. Dart and Wigan still compete against each other in soccer and Australian rules football matches. These houses used to be one, and their subsequent division may be the cause of the competition. The Dart-Wigan rivalry is often overlooked when competing against the "day" (non-boarding) houses.

There are also three girls' boarding houses, Hayhoe, Woodbridge and Larritt. Larritt was created to accommodate the ever-increasing number of boarders, housing exclusively female boarders in years 7, 8 and 9. Larritt girls 'graduate' to Hayhoe and Woodbridge when they reach year 10.

There are also eight-day houses, four for girls and four for boys. The girls' day houses are Manifold, Krome, Cuthbert and Macpherson. The boys' houses are Smith, Butler, Robin and Nevett.

All houses are named after people who were important to the school such as former Headmasters/Headmistresses or substantial donors, and are paired in brother-sister groups. While the houses are generally independent, they compete together in a number of competitions.

The pairs are:

 Macpherson  – Nevett 
 Manifold  – Smith 
 Woodbridge  – Dart 
 Hayhoe  – Wigan 
 Cuthbert  – Robin  
 Krome  – Butler 
 Larritt

Alumni

Academia
G. F. J. Dart, Ballarat Grammar headmaster 1942–1970
David Fleay , AM, naturalist
Dr Alan Kenneth Head PhD (Bristol), Mathematical Physicist at Brown University and University of Oxford
Prof. George Seddon AM – Professor of Environmental Science, University of Melbourne

Arts and media
Roy Dalgarno – Artist
Brian James – actor

Music
Warren Ellis – violinist, composer
David Hirschfelder – musician and composer
David Hobson – musician, composer and opera singer
James Valentine – musician, writer, radio and television presenter

Politics
 Henry Bolte – Premier of Victoria 1955–1972
 Thomas Hollway – Premier of Victoria 1947–50, 1952
 John Pasquarelli – Member of Parliament (Papua New Guinea) and aide to Pauline Hanson

Sport
 Rene Caris - Australian rules footballer
 Lauren Butler - Australian rules footballer
 Tamsin Barnett – Indoor and beach volleyball (2000 Sydney Olympics; 2008 Beijing Olympics; 2012 London Olympics)
 Stewart Crameri – Australian rules footballer
 Robert Eddy – Australian rules footballer
Katie Foulkes – Rowing, Olympian, women's eight coxswain in the 2000 Summer Olympics and the 2004 Summer Olympics.
 Tony Lockett – Australian rules footballer, member of Australian Football Hall of Fame with Legend status
 Emily Martin - Rowing, Olympian and two-time World Champion.
 Lloyd Meek - Australian rules footballer for the Fremantle Football Club
 Max Spittle – Australian rules footballer for the Melbourne Football Club
 Lucy Stephan – Rowing, 2016 Olympian (W8+), 2017 World Champion in the Women's Coxless Four, and 2020 Olympic Gold medalist (W4-)
 Tom Swann – Rowing Men's Eight (2012 London Olympics)
 Bronwyn Thompson – Rowing Women's Eight (1996 Atlanta and 2000 Sydney Olympics)
 Geoff Tunbridge – Australian rules footballer for the Melbourne Football Club
 John Vernon – High Jumper (Australian Champion, Empire Games 1954)

See also
 List of schools in Ballarat

References

Further reading 
 M.J.W. Boyle, Winds of Influence: A Short History of Ballarat Grammar 1911–1971 (n.d.)
 Susanne L. White, Mainly About Girls: A History of Queen's, Ballarat 1876–1972 (1990)

External links 
 Ballarat Grammar website

Boarding schools in Victoria (Australia)
Round Square schools
Private secondary schools in Victoria (Australia)
Grammar schools in Australia
Educational institutions established in 1876
Junior School Heads Association of Australia Member Schools
1876 establishments in Australia
Ballarat Associated Schools
Schools in Ballarat